, also romanized as Shōhei, was a  after Enchō and before Tengyō. This period spanned the years from April 931 through May 938.

Change of era
 January 22, 931 : The new era name was created to mark an event or series of events. The previous era ended and the new one commenced in Enchō 9, on the 26th day of the 4th month of 931.

Events of the Jōhei era
 September 3, 931 (Jōhei 1, 19th day of the 7th month): The former-Emperor Uda (867-931) died at the age of 65.
 932 (Jōhei 2, 8th month): The udaijin (Minister of the Right) Fujiwara no Sadakata (873-932) died at the age of 65.
 933 (Jōhei 3, 8th month): The dainagon (great counselor) Fujiwara no Nakahira, brother of sesshō (regent) Fujiwara Takahira, is named udaijin.
 933 (Jōhei 3, 12th month): Ten of the chief dignitaries of the empire went falcon-hunting together in Owari Province. Each of them was magnificent in his formal hunting attire.
 935 (Jōhei 5): The Great Fundamental Central Hall (kompon chūdō) on Mount Hiei burned down.
 September 7, 936 (Jōhei 6, 19th day of the 8th month): Fujiwara no Tadahira was named daijō-daijin (Prime Minister); and in this same period, Fujiwara Nakahira was named sadaijin (Minister of the Left), and Fujiwara Tsunesuke was named udaijin.
 937 (Jōhei 7, 12th month): The former-Emperor Yōzei celebrated his 70th birthday.

Notes

References
 Brown, Delmer M. and Ichirō Ishida, eds. (1979).  Gukanshō: The Future and the Past. Berkeley: University of California Press. ;  OCLC 251325323
 Nussbaum, Louis-Frédéric and Käthe Roth. (2005).  Japan encyclopedia. Cambridge: Harvard University Press. ;  OCLC 58053128
 Titsingh, Isaac. (1834). Nihon Ōdai Ichiran; ou,  Annales des empereurs du Japon.  Paris: Royal Asiatic Society, Oriental Translation Fund of Great Britain and Ireland. OCLC 5850691
 Varley, H. Paul. (1980). A Chronicle of Gods and Sovereigns: Jinnō Shōtōki of Kitabatake Chikafusa. New York: Columbia University Press. ;  OCLC 6042764

External links 
 National Diet Library, "The Japanese Calendar" -- historical overview plus illustrative images from library's collection

Japanese eras